The 2014–15 season of the 2. Bundesliga (women) was the eleventh season of Germany's second-tier women's football league. The season  began on 31 August 2014.

Changes
VfL Bochum  played in the north group, not in the south group like in previous season. VfL Bochum was automatically relegated back to the Regionalliga after the end of the season due to financial problems, failed to apply a license for next season, this means there will be no relegation playoff this season.

North

League table
Lübars won the league, but did not apply for a licence to the first Bundesliga because of financial reasons. Bremen therefore got promoted.

Results

Updated to games played on 26 May 2015
 Note 1: Home team is in left column and away team is in top row.

South

League table

Results

Updated to games played on 26 May 2015
 Note 1: Home team is in left column and away team is in top row.

Top scorers
As of 26 May 2015.

References

2014-15
2